Elvira Madigan is a 1943 Swedish romantic drama film directed by Åke Ohberg. The film is based on the famous true story of Elvira Madigan. The film stars Ohberg and Eva Henning. The film's sets were designed by the art director Max Linder.

Cast
Eva Henning as Elvira Madigan
Åke Ohberg as Count Christian, lieutenant
Irma Christenson as Antoinette, Christians wife
Gunnar Sjöberg as Frans, lieutenant
Marianne Löfgren as Mrs. von Scharfen
Ragnar Arvedson as Cavalry captain von Scharfen
Jullan Kindahl as Trine, Elviras mother
Otto Landahl as Mikael, Elviras father, a clown
Bror Bügler as Cavalry captain von Stern
Sven Bergvall as Colonel
Olav Riégo as Major Emmerich
Sven Lindberg as Lieutenant Ehrencreutz

External links
Elvira Madigan at IMDb
Elvira Madigan at Swedish Film Institute

1943 films
Swedish black-and-white films
Swedish romantic drama films
1943 romantic drama films
Films scored by Lars-Erik Larsson
Films directed by Åke Ohberg
1940s Swedish films